Ditsaan-Ramain, officially the Municipality of Ditsaan-Ramain (Maranao: Inged a Ditsaan-Ramain), is a 3rd class municipality in the province of Lanao del Sur, Philippines. According to the 2020 census, it has a population of 24,406 people.

History
Ditsaan-Ramain is part of the SHAKBA (Bubong, Buadi-Puso, Ditsa-an Ramain and Kapai). SHAKBA is a Maranao word which means links or interconnection. Shakba has many rivers and links to each other and this is where the name derives. Ditsa-an Ramain (shakba) is considered as peaceful among the municipalities of the province.

Geography

Barangays
Ditsaan-Ramain is politically subdivided into 35 barangays.

Climate

Demographics

Economy

References

External links
 Ditsaan-Ramain Profile at the DTI Cities and Municipalities Competitive Index
 [ Philippine Standard Geographic Code]
 Philippine Census Information
 Local Governance Performance Management System

Municipalities of Lanao del Sur
Populated places on Lake Lanao